Austrian pianist Artur Schnabel was the first pianist to record all of Ludwig van Beethoven's 32 piano sonatas. The recordings were made in Abbey Road Studios in London on a C. Bechstein grand piano from 1932 to 1935, seven years after electrical recording was invented. Originally recorded on 78 rpm phonograph records for the His Master's Voice (HMV) label, they have been reissued numerous times on LP and CD.

In 1932, HMV launched the Beethoven Society (sometimes referred to as the Beethoven Sonata Society) whose objective was to issue recordings of Schnabel's recordings of the sonatas to advance subscribers. Although Schnabel refused to make recordings for years, he agreed to take on the project. It began in January 1932, when the Sonata No. 31 in A major (Op. 110) was the first to be successfully recorded. The final recordings were made in November 1935, and the project culminated with Sonata No. 25 in G major (Op. 79). The Beethoven Society began distributing Schnabel's recordings in March 1932, issuing 12 volumes through 1937. Independently of the Beethoven Society series, Schnabel also recorded Sonata No. 30 in E major (Op. 109) and Sonata No. 32 in C minor (Op. 111) in 1942 for RCA Records, and the first movement of Sonata No. 14 in C minor (Op. 27 No. 2) in 1947, which was never issued on record.

The recordings continue to draw universal recognition and have received numerous honors. In 1937, Gramophone wrote: "To [his] technical mastery Schnabel adds and fuses an intensely intelligent, not merely 'intellectual' mind ... The result is a perfectly blended interpretation of the music as a spiritual expression and as a musical organism." In 1986, Tim Page, writing in The New York Times, noted that Schnabel's "historic" recordings were "the standard by which all subsequent performances have been judged". In 2014, William Robin of The New Yorker wrote that Schnabel "remains the eminent Beethoven interpreter on record". The recordings were inducted into the Grammy Hall of Fame in 1975 and the National Recording Registry of the Library of Congress in 2018.

Background 

Austrian pianist and composer Artur Schnabel (17 April 1882 – 15 August 1951) is considered one of the 20th century's most important musicians, and continues to be celebrated particularly for his performances of Beethoven and Schubert. Proclaimed by American music critic, journalist, and music writer Harold C. Schonberg as "the man who invented Beethoven", Schnabel's pedagogical lineage included Beethoven himself. When he was around ten years old, he began studying with Theodor Leschetizky, who was a student of Carl Czerny, who was in turn Beethoven's student, close friend and assistant. In 1927, on the centenary of Beethoven's death, Schnabel performed all 32 Beethoven sonatas for the first time in a series of seven recitals at the theatre of the Volksbühne in Berlin. He performed the complete cycle three more times in his life; in London in 1934, at New York's Carnegie Hall in 1934, and at the Berliner Philharmonie from 1932 to 1933.

During his life, Schnabel witnessed the development of sound-reproduction technology, with the inventions of the player piano, radio, and phonograph record. In 1905 he recorded several reproducing piano rolls (rolls that included the artist's expressiveness as well as notes) on a Welte-Mignon, including works of Chopin, Bach, Schubert, Brahms, Weber, and Josef Strauss. They were his first known recordings. A few weeks later, he wrote in the Welte Autograph Book: "With the artistic excellence of the Welte-Mignon, the extreme limits of possibility in the mechanical reproduction of music appear to have been reached. ... Instead of all traces of his art disappearing with the last note played, the Pianist has now the consoling certainty that his performances will survive him." About a year later, Ludwig Hupfeld placed another reproducing piano on the German market. Schnabel made several rolls for this new instrument, including a Chopin etude, a Schumann romance, and a Weber rondo. In 1922, as part of a contractual obligation, he made rolls for the American Piano Company's Ampico reproducing piano during his first American tour. In addition to works of Bach, Brahms, Schubert, and Weber, he recorded two pieces of Beethoven's.

Shortly after Schnabel's first performances of the Beethoven piano sonatas in Berlin’s Volksbühne, the Great Depression began, creating a drop in record sales. British record label His Master's Voice (HMV) made plans to release "Society" recordings, where wealthier classical music consumers could obtain recordings of "works or groups of musical works that appeal in the first instance more cultivated than to the general musical taste" by advance subscription. In 1929 Schnabel was approached by Fred Gaisberg, the artists' representative of Gramophone Company, HMV's parent company, who proposed Schnabel record Beethoven's complete piano works. Before the proposal, Schnabel had refused to make recordings for years, claiming they went "against the very nature of performance, for the nature of performance is to happen but once, to be absolutely ephemeral and unrepeatable." However, he accepted the project, and the Beethoven Society was formed to administrate the records' sales.

In mid-January, Schnabel tested the gramophone for the first time. He reported that the tests produced records that were "ugly in sound" but "musically satisfactory", which Cesar Saerchinger noted was "a seemingly curious distinction for a man who was praised throughout his career for his beautiful tone." In early February, Schnabel signed his contract.

Recording and production 
Principal recording of the complete sonatas for HMV took place from January 1932 to November 1935, with touch-up recordings made to several sonatas in 1937. They were all recorded at Abbey Road Studios's Studio No. 3 with Schnabel playing a C. Bechstein grand piano. They were made on 78 rpm discs, with each side holding approximately four minutes of music; "suitable breaks in the music, where one side ends and the next begins, had to be carefully worked out". The first session was on 21 January 1932, when Piano Sonata No. 31 in A major (Op. 110) was completed. Schnabel recorded two other sonatas that day, but problems related to the side-break placements prevented him from successfully completing them; they were finished later. Concurrently with the sonatas, Schnabel recorded all five Beethoven piano concertos, under the baton of Sir Malcolm Sargent.

References

Notes

Citations

Sources 

1930s classical albums
Grammy Hall of Fame Award recipients